Yellow-headed vulture may refer to two vulture species in the genus Cathartes.  They were considered one species until they were split in 1964:
 Lesser yellow-headed vulture, Cathartes burrovianus
 Greater yellow-headed vulture, Cathartes melambrotus

References